Nashriyah (lit. 'Publication' in Persian) is the name of a freely-available digital collection of Iranian print media, created and maintained by the University of Manchester Library. The project was launched in 2016 after two years of digitization works, and mainly includes newspapers and magazines published during the 1950s, as well as the late 1970s. Though the archive misses a large number of important periodicals and some of its collections are incomplete, it has made rare publications available for the first time.

Archive 
The archive currently covers two periods of the Mohammad Mosaddegh administration and the Iranian Revolution.

The 1950s collection 
 Iran-e Bastan (101 issues, 1933–1935)
 Khak va Khun (139 issues, 1965–1966)
 Mardom-e Iran (50 issues, 1952–1953)
 Elm va Zendegi (9 issues, 1959–1961)
 Nabard-e Zendegi (15 issues, 1952–1953)
 Niru-ye Sevvom (129 issues, 1953)
 Shouresh (40 issues, 1951–1953)
 Tehran-e-Mosavvar (126 issues, 1952–1955)

The 1979 Revolution collection 
 Rastakhiz (234 issues, 1975–1978)
 Rastakhiz-e Kargaran (26 issues, 1975–1976)
 Andisheha-ye Rastakhiz (6 issues, 1976–1978)
 Kayhan (723 issues, 1979–1981)
 Ayandegan (157 issues, 1979)
 Parkhash (full archive, 1979)
 Mojahed (195 issues, 1979–1984)
 Rah-e Mojahed (69 issues, 1981–1992)
 Peygham-e Emrouz (91 issues, 1979)
 Pirouzi (4 issues, 1980)
 Rah-e Kargar (5 issues, 1983–1987)
 Ommat (full archive, 1979–1981)
 Jonbesh (83 issues, 1977–1980)
 Parkhash (full archive, 1979)
 Tehran-e Mosavvar (34 issues, 1978–1979)
 Shora-ye Nevisandegan (6 issues, 1980–1982)
 Sepid va Siah (34 issues, 1978–1979)
 Ahangar  (full archive, 1979)
 Javanan-e Emrouz (41 issues, 1979)
 Ettehad-e Javan (9 issues, 1979)
 Ettehad-e Mardom (117 issues, 1979–1982)
 Sogand (22 issues, 1979)
 Ferdowsi (30 issues, 1978–1979)
 Farda-ye Iran (10 issues, 1980–1982)

See also 
 Project Translatio
 List of digital library projects

References

External links 
 Nashriyah: digital Iranian history
 JSTOR archive

University of Manchester
Digital library projects